Fort Wicked was a ranch and stage station on the Overland Trail (South Platte Trail) from 1864 to 1868 in present-day Merino, Colorado. A historical marker commemorating the ranch is located at US 6 and CR-2.5. The ranch itself was located near a ford of the South Platte River, near where US-6 now crosses over the river. It was one of the few places along the trail to Denver that withstood an attack by Native Americans in 1864. It was named Fort Wicked for the "bitter defence" made by Holon Godfrey.

Godfrey Ranch and establishment of a fort

After having followed the gold rush to California and then returned to his family in Wisconsin, Holon Godfrey moved to Colorado with the Pike's Peak Gold Rush (1859) and then settled in the Merino area about 1863, where he established a farm and built a sod house and stable. Most of his family of seven children followed him to Colorado.

After the Overland Stage Route was established along the South Platte Trail in 1862, Holon Godfrey and his wife Matilda operated a stage station, rest stop, and general store along the route near Merino. Godfrey was also a blacksmith and he bought road-weary horses from pioneers and after giving them a rest and reconditioning them, sold the now healthy horses to other travelers. The ranch sold "needle-gun whiskey" and occasionally provided lodging. In 1864, there was increased likelihood of attacks by Native Americans in the area and he made a fortress out of his ranch with gun ports put in between adobe bricks, a lookout tower on top of the house, and a six-foot high wall surrounding the property.

Retribution for Sand Creek Massacre

Julesburg was attacked on January 7, 1865 by about 1,000 Cheyenne and Sioux men in retribution for the Sand Creek massacre. At Fort Sedgwick, several Native Americans and some soldiers were killed, and there was so much food looted from Julesburg that it took three days to remove it to their village at Cherry Creek or Sand Creek. Three groups of Native Americans, the Arapaho, Cheyenne, and Sioux then attacked stage stations and ranches along the South Platte Trail over six days. They killed more people than were killed at the Sand Creek Massacre, burned buildings, tore down telegraph lines. They also looted horses, 2000 cattle, and wagon trains, one of which had 22 wagons.

Raid 

Holon Godfrey and his family held off an attack by Native Americans, called the Raid on Godfrey Ranch, on 	January 15, 1865. The ranch was attacked by a band of 130 Lakota  and Cheyenne warriors. Godfrey, his family, and his ranch hands, fortified their ranch for the attack. The Indian warriors attacked the ranch from which they were met by gunfire from the cowboys stationed inside. They also set the grass surrounding the house on fire, which Godfrey put out with pails of water. The battle lasted from night till morning, with the Indians using various tactics such as trying to burn the house with flaming arrows to kill the men inside, all of which failed. A ranch hand, Mr. Perkins, risked his life by leaving the fort to ride to Fort Morgan to get soldiers or send a telegraph to Denver requesting help. By morning the tribesmen finally left and, according to Godfrey, the bodies of 3-17 of their dead laid outside. To the contrary, Cheyenne warrior George Bent does not mention Godfrey's Ranch and claimed that only three Indians were killed during all the battles along the Southern Platte River in 1865. Godfrey's ranch, which was then christened as Fort Wicked, was one of the few ranches to survive the January 1865 attacks. The cavalry arrived after the Native Americans had left. The nearby American Ranch was also attacked.

Aftermath
After the raid, Godfrey painted a sign with the ranch's new name, "Fort Wicked", on the gate of his fort. There was another raid in 1867. The Godfreys left their ranch about 1868, when the Union Pacific Railroad reached Cheyenne, Wyoming. In 1869 or 1870, the Godfreys moved to Platte River district of LaSalle, Colorado, south of Greeley, and raised stock and farmed. He and his wife are considered pioneers there, with the Godfrey ditch and Godfrey Bottoms named for him. Nothing remains of the former ranch and stage station, but a historical marker was placed at the site, which is about three miles southwest of Merino.

References

External links
 Historical marker for Fort Wicked

Wicked
1863 establishments in Colorado Territory
Buildings and structures in Logan County, Colorado